John Summers High School (formerly Deeside High School) was an 11–18 mixed, English-medium, secondary school and sixth form in Queensferry, Flintshire, Wales. It closed on 20 July 2017.

Its sixth form education was provided through the Deeside Consortium, a group of three local high schools and the nearby sixth form college although Deeside College has now withdrawn from this consortium.

References

External links 
  (inactive)

Secondary schools in Flintshire
Educational institutions disestablished in 2017
2017 disestablishments in Wales